Miscera basichrysa is a moth in the family Brachodidae. It was described by Oswald Bertram Lower in 1916. It is found in Australia and New Guinea.

Subspecies
Miscera basichrysa basichrysa
Miscera basichrysa extensa Kallies, 1998 (New Guinea)

References

Brachodidae
Moths described in 1916